Yato is a surname. Notable people with the name include:

Peceli Yato (born 1993), Fijian rugby player
Tamotsu Yato (1928(?)–1973), Japanese photographer and occasional actor

See also
Yato Dharma Tato Jaya, is a Sanskrit shloka
Yato-no-kami, are snake deities in Japanese folklore appearing in the Hitachi no Kuni Fudoki